There's Good Boos To-Night is a 1948 animated short directed by Izzy Sparber and narrated by Frank Gallop, featuring Casper the Friendly Ghost. It is the second cartoon in the Casper series. The title is a play on "There's good news tonight", the sign-on catchphrase of radio commentator Gabriel Heatter.

Plot 
The cartoon opens with Casper sitting beside his grave, decorated with the Bible segment 'love thy neighbor', reading a book on animal friends.  Around midnight, while the ghosts at the cemetery, where Casper is buried, are getting ready to go off and "boo" people, Casper is trying to make friends with animals instead of humans. The ghosts leave the cemetery, as does Casper, who wanders off looking for friends in a couple of animals. However, when Casper tries to make friends with a baby calf, it runs away, calling for its "mama"; when the calf's mother goes up to Casper, she runs away from the farm and jumps over the moon.

Later, Casper comes across a skunk and asks it to be friends, but it sprays him and runs away in terror. Casper sits on a log and cries because none of the animals wants to be his friend. While Casper is seated on the log, he catches the attention of a small fox cub who feels sorry for him. Casper and the fox quickly bond, and he names the cub "Ferdie" and considers him his best friend. However, Casper and Ferdie's relationship soon becomes jeopardised while playing a game of Hide and Seek. While Ferdie is hiding, a hunter and two of his hunting dogs come and try to kill Ferdie. They pursue him until he is exhausted and out of breath.

While the hunter is firing gunshots toward Ferdie, Casper flies in the hunter's direction and demands they leave Ferdie alone. When the dogs and the hunter see Casper, they flee in terror. Casper looks for Ferdie to tell him that the hunters are gone but discovers that Ferdie is dead as the bullets had passed through Casper’s incorporeal form and hit him. Casper cradles the fox’s body and breaks down in tears, having lost the only friend he has ever had in his life.
Casper returns to the cemetery, where he buries Ferdie next to his gravestone. Casper begins mourning but soon discovers that Ferdie has returned as a ghost.  Reunited, Casper and Ferdie live happily ever after.

Additional Voice Cast 
 Cecil Roy voices Casper
 Sid Raymond voices Other Ghosts
 Jack Mercer voices Other Ghosts, Ferdie Fox, Calf

References

External links 

BCDB

1948 animated films
1940s American animated films
American animated short films
1940s English-language films
Films directed by Isadore Sparber
Casper the Friendly Ghost films
1940s animated short films
1948 short films
Paramount Pictures short films
Animated films about foxes
American ghost films